Keith Stephen (born 24 October 1968) is a former Scottish professional darts player who has played in Professional Darts Corporation events.

Career
Known as Kjer, Stephen qualified for the 2013 European Darts Open on the PDC European Tour, but lost his first round match to Adrian Lewis.

He also qualified for the UK Open in 2012, and held a PDC Tour Card between 2012–13.

Stephen quit of the PDC in 2015.

References

External links

Scottish darts players
1968 births
Living people
Professional Darts Corporation former tour card holders